Liski may refer to:

Places
Liski (Lošinj), a place on the island of Lošinj, Croatia
Liski, Iran, a village in South Khorasan Province, Iran
Liski, Gmina Dołhobyczów in Lublin Voivodeship, east Poland
Liski, Gmina Horodło in Lublin Voivodeship, east Poland
Liski, Bartoszyce County in Warmian-Masurian Voivodeship, north Poland
Liski, Ełk County in Warmian-Masurian Voivodeship, north Poland
Liski, Gołdap County in Warmian-Masurian Voivodeship, north Poland
Liski, Pisz County in Warmian-Masurian Voivodeship, north Poland
Liski Urban Settlement, an administrative division and a municipal formation comprising the town of Liski and the khutor of Kalach in Voronezh Oblast, Russia
Liski, Russia, several inhabited localities in Russia
Liski (Kiliya raion), a village in Odessa Oblast, Ukraine

People
 (1939–2005), Honorary Professor in Arts, theater manager, theater director. Finnish actor featured as private Rokka in The Unknown Soldier, Aapo, Friends, Comrades or Poet and Muse
 (born 1965), Finnish actor in Finnish National Theater. Drummer, songwriter and producer in pop-rock band Adam & Eve. Host in the Finnish version of The Price Is Right. Featured in Salatut elämät and Uusi päivä.
 (born 1947), Emeritus Professor of Statistics in University of Tampere. (Co)author of seven books and over one hundred scientific papers. A wide variety of courses at both undergraduate and postgraduate level and numerous management positions.

Other uses
FC Lokomotiv Liski, a Russian association football club from Liski, Voronezh Oblast, Russia

See also
Lisky (disambiguation)